Benito Cosme Legarda y Tuason (September 27, 1853 – August 27, 1915) was a Filipino legislator who was a member of the Philippine Commission of the American colonial Insular Government, the government's legislature, and later a Resident Commissioner from the Philippine Islands to the United States Congress.

Early life and education
He was born in Manila, Philippines on September 27, 1853 to a Spanish-Filipino mestizo family.  He attended the Jesuits' College and the University of Santo Tomas of Manila.

Political life
He started his political life as a member of President Emilio Aguinaldo's cabinet at Malolos and vice president of the Filipino Congress. He later became a member of the Philippine Commission in 1901 and was elected as a Resident Commissioner to the Sixtieth and to the two succeeding Congresses (November 22, 1907 - March 3, 1912). He was not a candidate for renomination to the Sixty-third Congress in 1912, in large part due to opposition to his candidacy from the Philippine Assembly. He founded the Federalista Party in the early part of the 20th century.  He was an upper-class Filipino who cooperated with the United States.

Death
Benito Legarda died on August 27, 1915, in Evian-les-Bains, France. He is buried at the Manila North Cemetery.

Legacy
The Legarda Elementary School and Legarda Street in Manila were named in Legarda's honor.

See also
List of Asian Americans and Pacific Islands Americans in the United States Congress
List of Hispanic Americans in the United States Congress

References

1853 births
1915 deaths
Burials at the Manila North Cemetery
Filipino nationalists
Filipino people of Spanish descent
Hispanic and Latino American members of the United States Congress
Members of the United States Congress of Filipino descent
People from Quiapo, Manila
Resident Commissioners of the Philippines
University of Santo Tomas alumni
Members of the Philippine Commission